Born Annoying is a compilation album of alternative metal band Helmet's early songs, released in 1995 by their old label, Amphetamine Reptile, a.k.a. AmRep.  It is a collection of singles, B sides, compilation tracks, and other rarities spanning from the band's inception in 1989 until they were signed to Interscope in 1992.  However, the band did record two songs in 1993 that were released through AmRep; they are included here.

The cover art is a bronze-colored version of the same photo used on the "Born Annoying" 7" single.

Track listing

Personnel
 Page Hamilton – guitar, vocals
 Peter Mengede – guitar
 Henry Bogdan – bass
 John Stanier – drums

References

Helmet (band) albums
Amphetamine Reptile Records albums
1995 compilation albums